This list comprises all players who have participated in at least one league match for Portland Timbers 2 since the team's first USL season in 2015. Players who were on the roster but never played a first team game are not listed; players who appeared for the team in the U.S. Open Cup but never actually made an USL appearance are noted at the bottom of the page.

A "†" denotes players who only appeared in a single match.

A
 Victor Arboleda
 Gbenga Arokoyo †
 Dairon Asprilla †

B
 Jack Barmby †
 Kharlton Belmar
 Nick Besler
 Santiago Biglieri
 Villyan Bijev
 Blake Bodily
 Neco Brett

C
 Seth Casiple
 Rennico Clarke

D
 Dylan Damraoui
 Harrison Delbridge
 Christian Duarte

E
 Steven Evans

F
 Marco Farfan
 Gastón Fernández †
 Devon Fisher
 George Fochive

G
 Michael Gallagher
 Blair Gavin
 Jake Gleeson

H
 Wade Hamilton

I
 Akinjide Idowu †

J
 Jeanderson
 Will Johnson

K
 Chris Klute

L
 Andre Lewis
 Terrell Lowe
 Justin Luthy

M
 Anthony Manning
 Kendall McIntosh
 Alexis Meva
 Trevor Morley

N
 Michael Nanchoff

O
 Amobi Okugo

P
 Steve Palacios
 Norberto Paparatto †
 Tim Payne
 Taylor Peay
 Ben Polk
 Alvas Powell

R
 Brent Richards
 Matt Rose

S
 Fatawu Safiu
 Michael Seaton

T
 Steven Taylor
 Andy Thoma
 Schillo Tshuma

W
 Andrew Weber
 Augustine Williams
 Rundell Winchester

Miscellaneous
 Danny O'Rourke — Made one U.S. Open Cup appearance.

External links

Portland Timbers 2
 
Association football player non-biographical articles